Rebecca Gwendolyn Smith (born June 3, 1959), professionally known as Becky Smith and later known by her married name Becky Wiber, is a Canadian former medley and butterfly swimmer who won the bronze medal in the women's 400-metre individual medley at the 1976 Summer Olympics in Montreal, Quebec, Canada, finishing behind East German Ulrike Tauber (gold) and her Canadian teammate Cheryl Gibson (silver).  At the same Olympic Games, she also finished third in the women's 4×100-metre freestyle relay, alongside Gail Amundrud, Barbara Clark and Anne Jardin. Her brothers Graham and sister George also competed in swimming.

She was a grade school teacher at Westbrook School in Edmonton, Alberta for Grade 6. She retired in 2019.

See also
 List of Olympic medalists in swimming (women)
 List of Commonwealth Games medallists in swimming (women)

References
 Canadian Olympic Committee

1959 births
Living people
Canadian female butterfly swimmers
Canadian female freestyle swimmers
Canadian female medley swimmers
Commonwealth Games bronze medallists for Canada
Commonwealth Games gold medallists for Canada
Commonwealth Games silver medallists for Canada
Olympic bronze medalists for Canada
Olympic bronze medalists in swimming
Olympic swimmers of Canada
Swimmers from Edmonton
Swimmers at the 1974 British Commonwealth Games
Swimmers at the 1976 Summer Olympics
Swimmers at the 1978 Commonwealth Games
World Aquatics Championships medalists in swimming
Medalists at the 1976 Summer Olympics
Commonwealth Games medallists in swimming
20th-century Canadian women
Medallists at the 1974 British Commonwealth Games
Medallists at the 1978 Commonwealth Games